Torba is a sea-side village near Bodrum in the Mugla Province, Turkey.

The hillsides are clad in olive groves and pine forests. The shoreline is dotted with cafes and open-air restaurants, specializing in catch-of-the-day seafood, lamb kebabs and traditional mezes (Turkish tapas). Despite some recent upmarket developments, the village has retained a relaxed, rural ambience. Because of its close proximity to Bodrum town, Torba is popular with day-trippers who come for a swim, a stroll along the idyllic shoreline or a candle-lit dinner on the beach. Hotels and all-inclusive resorts are there as well.    

Some of the fish in Torba Bay include sea bass and gilt-head bream. Other marine life include sea turtles, dolphins or the rare Mediterranean monk seal.

External links
Profile of Torba at bodrum.org

Towns in Turkey